Hooton is a surname. Notable people with the surname include:

Burt Hooton, American baseball player
Earnest Hooton (1887–1954), American anthropologist
Elizabeth Hooton (1600–1672), Quaker preacher
Florence Hooton (1912–1988), English cellist
Harriet Hooton (1875–1960), Australian editor and activist
Harry Hooton (1908–1961), Australian poet
James Hooton (born 1973), English actor
Peter Hooton, English vocalist

See also 

 Hooton (disambiguation)